Great Southern may refer to:

Great Southern (automobile), a car in production from 1910 to 1914
Great Southern (band), the backing band for American rock guitarist Dickey Betts
Great Southern (train), a luxury train service in Australia
Great Southern (Western Australia), a region in Western Australia
Great Southern (wine region), in Western Australia
Great Southern Group, a corporate group in Australia which collapsed in 2009
Great Southern Television, based in Auckland and Sydney
TSS Great Southern (1902), a ship built in 1902 for the Great Western Railway
Great Southern Bank, Australian bank

See also
Great Southern Railway (disambiguation)